Victor E. Soltero (born August 6, 1938) is a Democratic politician. He served as Arizona State Senator for District 29 from 2003 to 2008, and earlier from 1991 through 2000. He was a member of the Arizona House of Representatives from 2000 through 2003, and Mayor of the City of South Tucson from 1988 through 1999.

References

External links

 Senator Victor Soltero – District 29 official State Senate website
 Profile at Project Vote Smart
 Follow the Money – Victor Soltero
 2006 2004 1998 1996 State Senate campaign contributions
 2002 2000 State House campaign contributions

1938 births
Living people
Democratic Party Arizona state senators
Democratic Party members of the Arizona House of Representatives
People from Globe, Arizona
Universidad de Sonora alumni
20th-century American politicians
21st-century American politicians
Mayors of places in Arizona